Al Taqadom Anqoun Club , or simply Taqadom Anqoun, is a football club based in Anqoun, Lebanon, that competes in the .

The club reached the quarter-finals of the 2018–19 Lebanese FA Cup as the only Lebanese Third Division club remaining in the tournament. They were defeated 6–0 by Nejmeh.

See also 
 List of football clubs in Lebanon

References 

Football clubs in Lebanon